The Roman circus (from the Latin word that means "circle") was a large open-air venue used for public events in the ancient Roman Empire. The circuses were similar to the ancient Greek hippodromes, although circuses served varying purposes and differed in design and construction. Along with theatres, amphitheatres, and the similar but much smaller stadiums, circuses were one of the main entertainment sites of the time. Circuses were venues for chariot races, horse races, gladiatorial combat, and performances that commemorated important events of the Empire were performed there.

According to Edward Gibbon, in Chapter XXXI of his work The History of the Decline and Fall of the Roman Empire, the Roman people, at the start of the 5th century:

Architectural design

The performance space of the Roman circus was normally, despite its name, an oblong rectangle of two linear sections of race track, separated by a median strip running along the length of about two thirds the track, joined at one end with a semicircular section and at the other end with an undivided section of track closed (in most cases) by a distinctive starting gate known as the carceres, thereby creating a circuit for the races. The Circus Maximus epitomises the design.

The median strip was called the spina and usually featured ornate columns, statues and commemorative obelisks. The turning points on either end of the spina were usually marked by conical poles, called the metae (singular: meta).

The performance surface of the circus was normally surrounded by ascending seating along the length of both straight sides and around the curved end, though there were sometimes interruptions in the seating to provide access to the circus or the seating, or to provide for special viewing platforms for dignitaries and officials. One circus, that at Antinoöpolis (Egypt), displays a distinct gap of some 50m between the carceres and the start of the ascending seating where there is apparently no structure. This appears to be an exception.

The great majority of circuses fit the description above. Those that do not display two different variations: that at Emerita Augusta (Mérida, Spain), where the carceres end is substituted by a slightly curved 'straight' end joined to the straight sides of ascending seating by rounded corners of ascending seating; and a few in which the carceres end is substituted by a second semi-circular end to produce an oval shaped arena. These latter circuses are normally small (Nicopolis (Greece) and Aphrodisias (Turkey)), and should probably be considered stadia.

There are similar buildings, called 'stadia, which were used for Greek style athletics. These buildings were similar in design but typically smaller than circuses; however, the distinction is not always clear. An example of this type is the Stadium of Domitian.

Common characteristics

Dates
Differently from other major Roman structures circuses frequently evolved over long periods of time from a simple track in a field, through generations of wooden seating structures (frequently destroyed by fire or rot), before they finally began to be converted to stone. Although circuses such as the Circus Maximus (Italy) may have existed in some form from as early as around 500 BC, circuses were mainly constructed during the 400 years between 200 BC and 200 AD.

Dimensions
The comparative dimensions of a circus may be measured in two basic ways: by the length of the track, and by the seating capacity. Other dimensions, such as the external dimensions of the structure may vary considerably depending on the location, the site, and on specific architectural characteristics.

The simplest comparative measurement of a circus is its track length. This is the most easily measured dimension, as it only requires small excavations at either end of the centreline. It is very probable that this can be done even when the circus is buried under subsequent constructions. Track lengths may vary from the 245 m of the circus at Gerasa (Jordan), to the 621 m of the Circus Maximus (Italy).

The alternative comparative dimension is that of seating capacity. This is much more complex to measure as it requires that the dimensions of the original vertical and horizontal extent of the inclined seating be re-established. In many cases the full structure of the inclined seating has been destroyed beyond the point where this can be measured, or at the least would require a great deal more excavation than that required for the measurement of the track length. Seating capacity may vary from around 15,000 people at Gerasa (Jordan), to 150,000 (some estimates put it up to 250,000) at the Circus Maximus (Italy).

Orientation
Circuses do not appear to have been constructed with any special compass orientation. Those that are well identified can be found with their round ends oriented around the compass. Examples include: N. Gerasa (Jordan); NE. Antinoöpolis (Egypt); E. Circus of Maxentius (Italy); SE. Circus Maximus (Italy); S. Tyrus (Lebanon); SW. Gortyn (Greece); W. Circus of Nero (Italy).

Relative location
Circuses can be found at three distinct locations relative to the towns to which they belong:
 outside the city walls at anything up to 1.5 km distant, as at: Gerasa (Jordan) (c300m), and Leptis Magna (Libya) (1.5 km).
 simply within the town walls, as at: Thessalonica (Greece).
 inside the walls, in the heart of the town, and an integral part of the architectural power structure of the town, as at: Rome, Sirmium (Serbia) and Tarraco (Spain).

Carceres
The carceres, or starting gates, had a distinctive, slanted, slightly curved, plan form, designed to compensate for what would otherwise be significant differences in the distances from the individual starting gates to the start of the first section of straight track on the right hand side of the spina (as seen from the carceres). The carceres were designed for the races to be run round the spina in an anticlockwise direction.

The form of the carceres appears to have been standardised throughout the Roman world. The similarity in form among the carceres of circuses of many different sizes suggests that carceres were constructed according to a series of proportional mathematical relationships or formulas. It is not clear when the earliest carceres of the standardised form was constructed, nor whether there exists documentary evidence for the existence of such formulas.

Some of the best examples of carceres'' can be found at: Gerasa (Jordan) and the Circus of Maxentius (Italy).

Best preserved
The best preserved circuses include: Emerita Augusta (Spain), Caesarea Maritima (coastal) (Israel), Circus of Maxentius (Italy), Gerasa (Jordan), Tyrus (Lebanon), Leptis Magna (Libya).

List of Roman circuses

Unless otherwise indicated the coordinates in the following list are of a point that lies within the space of a circus. For the remaining circuses (those whose detailed location is not known) the point is for a location within the space of the historic nucleus of the associated town, or for a location within the associated archaeological site. These points are probably within 1.5 kilometres of the site of the circus, as a circus was almost always within this distance from its associated town.

(ordered initially by country; number of circuses at latest count (2012-04-01): 63)

See also

 Hippodrome – a Greek arena also used for chariot racing

References

External links

 Cyrene
 Ondernemen.in: List of circus-hippodrome structures
 Google Earth file containing several locations

 01
Ancient chariot racing
Ancient Roman architecture
Horse racing venues
Sport in ancient Rome